2,2-Dimethoxy-2-phenylacetophenone is a photoinitiator, which is used to initialize radical polymerization e.g. in the preparation of acrylate polymers. Under the influence of light the molecule will form radicals which initiate the radical polymerization. It can also be used as an initiator in the process of making an integrated circuit.

References 

Ketones
Ketals